Rolf Höglund (born 14 August 1940) is a Swedish bobsledder. He competed in the two-man and the four-man events at the 1968 Winter Olympics.

References

External links
 

1940 births
Living people
Swedish male bobsledders
Olympic bobsledders of Sweden
Bobsledders at the 1968 Winter Olympics
People from Finspång Municipality
Sportspeople from Östergötland County